The Melito (possibly ) is an Italian river whose source is in Aspromonte National Park. The river flows south past Bagaladi and San Lorenzo before emptying into the Ionian Sea at Melito di Porto Salvo.

References

Drainage basins of the Ionian Sea
Rivers of the Province of Reggio Calabria
Rivers of Italy